is a passenger railway station  located in the city of  Takarazuka Hyōgo Prefecture, Japan. It is operated by the private transportation company Hankyu Railway.

Lines

Layout
The station consists of two opposed ground-level side platforms, connected by a footbridge. The effective length of the platform is 6 cars for Track 1 and 8 cars for Track 2.

Platforms

Adjacent stations

History
Obayashi Station opened on September 2, 1921.

Passenger statistics
In fiscal 2019, the station was used by an average of 17,196 passengers daily

Surrounding area
Obayashi Sacred Heart School
Takarazuka Municipal Yoshimoto Elementary School

See also
List of railway stations in Japan

References

External links

Obayashi Station (Hankyu Railway) 

Railway stations in Hyōgo Prefecture
Hankyu Railway Imazu Line
Stations of Hankyu Railway
Railway stations in Japan opened in 1921
Takarazuka, Hyōgo